This list of information schools, sometimes abbreviated to iSchools, includes members of the iSchools organization.

iSchools organization
The iSchools organization reflects a consortium of over 100 information schools across the globe. iSchools promote an interdisciplinary approach to understanding the opportunities and challenges of information management, with a core commitment to concepts like universal access and user-centered organization of information.  The field is concerned broadly with questions of design and preservation across information spaces, from digital and virtual spaces such as online communities, social networking, the World Wide Web, and databases to physical spaces such as libraries, museums, collections, and other repositories. "School of Information", "Department of Information Studies", or "Information Department" are often the names of the participating organizations.

Degree programs at iSchools include course offerings in areas such as information architecture, design, policy, and economics; knowledge management, user experience design, and usability; preservation and conservation; librarianship and library administration; the sociology of information; and human-computer interaction and computer science.

Leadership 
The executive committee of the iSchools is made up of the current chair (Sam Oh, SKKU, Korea), past chair (Michael Seadle, Humboldt-Universität zu Berlin, Germany), and the chair elect (Gobinda Choudhury, Northumbria University, UK), plus representatives from the three regions (North America, Europe, and Asia-Pacific). The current executive director is Michael Seadle.

iConferences
Members of the iSchools organize a regular academic conference, known as the iConference, hosted by a different member institution each year.
 September 2005: Pennsylvania State University
 October 2006: University of Michigan
 February 2008: University of California, Los Angeles
 February 2009: University of North Carolina
 February 2010: University of Illinois at Urbana-Champaign
 February 2011: University of Washington, Seattle
 February 2012: University of Toronto
 February 2013: University of North Texas
 March 2014: Humboldt-Universität zu Berlin
 March 2015: University of California, Irvine
 March 2016: Drexel University
 March 2017: Wuhan University
 March 2018: University of Sheffield and Northumbria University
 March 2019: University of Maryland
 March 2020: University of Borås
 March 2023: Universitat Oberta de Catalunya

Other schools of information
Other information schools and programs include:
Documentation Research and Training Centre, Indian Statistical Institute, Bangalore
San Jose State University, School of Information
University at Albany, SUNY, College of Emergency Preparedness, Homeland Security and Cybersecurity
University of Southern California Library Science Degree
Ankara University, Department of Information and Records Management, Ankara/Turkey
Marmara University, Department of Information and Records Management, İstanbul/Turkey
University of Kelaniya, Department of Library and Information Science, Kelaniya/Sri Lanka
University of Colombo, National Institute of Library and Information Science (NILIS), Colombo/Sri Lanka
Chicago State University,    Department of Information Studies

See also
List of Library Science schools

References

Information science
Library science education

Lists of universities and colleges